"Rudbarak" is a village in Kelardasht city, Mazandaran Province, in the north of Iran that excites the hearts of every viewer. It is one of the touristy neighborhoods located in the easternmost point of Kelardasht and has a beautiful and lush nature.

One of the spectacular attractions of this village is the existence of Alam-Kuh mountain, with an elevation of 4,850 meters it is the second-highest peak in Iran after Mount Damavand. The existence of Takht-e Suleyman Massif natural glaciers and the Mountaineering Federation of this region has caused many tourists to come to this mountain range every year for mountaineering and conquer it. One of the most spectacular and pristine attractions of Kelardasht is the cold-blooded river "Sardabrood", which is a part of the country's protected rivers, flows throughout the village, and has created a pleasant atmosphere by dividing this place into two parts. Do not miss the "Ekapel waterfall" with an elevation of 20 meters when you enter the village. The mountains and upstream areas of Rudbarak village also have medicinal plants and a variety of mountain vegetables and mushrooms. Vandarbon is one of the most beautiful places in the village and has an indescribable beauty. The Trout fish in freshwater is raised by the local people in the village. Granite quarry located in this place is one of the largest mines exported to the whole country. Rudbarak Mosque is considered one of the wonders of architectural art, a mosque with an area of about 200 square meters without any columns in the middle of it is one of the most creative architectural works in Kelardasht.

Populated places in Chalus County